Justice for All with Judge Cristina Perez is an American nontraditional/dramatized court show that debuted in first-run syndication on September 17, 2012. The series, which is created by Byron Allen through his production company, Entertainment Studios, is presided by lawyer and award-winning TV judge Cristina Perez. Perez returned to U.S. television following a three-year stint on the three-time Daytime Emmy Award winning, 20th Television-distributed court show, Cristina's Court (2006–09), cancelled due to low ratings. Justice for All with Judge Cristina Perez is unique in that it's the first court show and one of few television series to simultaneously produce English and Spanish-language versions.

Like Entertainment Studios's two other courtroom programs, America's Court with Judge Ross and We the People, Justice for All is a staged court show. At the end of the program, a standard disclaimer is shown which states that "All characters displayed are fictional and any resemblance to actual persons is coincidental." As of the first half of the 2012-13 television season, the three court shows presently produced by Entertainment Studios have been the lowest rated in the court show genre.

Production and distribution
In March 2012, Entertainment Studios sold the program to stations covering approximately 85% of all U.S. markets, including those owned by CBS Television Stations, Weigel Broadcasting, Sinclair Broadcast Group, Media General, Gray Television, LIN Media, Nexstar Broadcasting Group and Meredith Corporation. On July 22, 2013, Entertainment Studios renewed the series for its second and third seasons. In September 2020, Entertainment Studios announced that the series was renewed for 7 more seasons through the fall of 2027.

Cast

Main 

 Cristina Perez as Herself (Judge)
 Renard Spivey as Himself (Bailiff), who also according to sources has allegedly murdered his wife.

Guest Stars 

 Mary Cruz as Kelly
 Dyanne Klinko as Tara Stewart (Defendant)
 Brashaad Mayweather as DJ Sapphire / DJ
 Jason Shoemaker as Larry Mondello
 Holly Haith as Brittney / Ashley Smith
 Tyrone Evans Clark as Andrew Sinclair
 Michael Klaumann as Anthony Moore
 Brent Duffey as Dylan / Chris
 Daniel Glass as Anthony Franklin

References

External links
 Official website
    
 Justice For All with Judge Cristina Perez at TV Guide
 Justice For All with Judge Cristina Perez at DIRECTV

2012 American television series debuts
2010s American reality television series
First-run syndicated television programs in the United States
Court shows
English-language television shows
Spanish-language television programming in the United States
Television series by Entertainment Studios
2020s American reality television series